Sulayman ibn Kathir (Arabic: سلیمان بن کثیر) was martyred at the Battle of Karbala. His name was mentioned in al-Ziyara al-Rajabiyya for Hussain ibn Ali and al-Ziyara for Ali Akbar and other martyrs of Karbala.

Some have considered it possible that he was, in fact, Muslim ibn Kathir al-Azdi. No information is found about his personality, life, lineage or family.

References 

People killed at the Battle of Karbala
680 deaths
Husayn ibn Ali
Hussainiya